Bohemia was a German newspaper published in Prague from 1828 to 1938.

History and profile
Famous writers for the newspaper included Franz Kafka, Egon Kisch, Hans Heinz Stuckenschmidt, and Johannes Urzidil.

The newspaper was printed by several companies:
  & Sons (1828–1872)
 Bohemia Aktiengesellschaft (1872–1877)
 Frantisek Klutsack (1878)
 Andreas Haase (1879–1919)
 Alfred Korn (1919–1920)
 Verlag Deutsche Zeitung-Aktiengesellschaft (1920–1933)
 Rota-Aktiengesellschaft für Zeitung- und Buchdruck (1933–1938)

The newspaper was terminated in 1938. The archives can be found in the National Library of the Czech Republic.

Since 2000

References

External links
 Scanned archives (as DjVu):
 1830–1832: Bohemia, oder Unterhaltungsblätter für gebildete Stände, ISSN 1802-6303
 1832–1845: Bohemia, ein Unterhaltungsblatt, ISSN 1802-6311
 1846–1914: Bohemia [dead link], ISSN 1212-6225
 1914–1938: Deutsche Zeitung Bohemia, ISSN 1802-6370

German-language newspapers published in Czechoslovakia
History of Prague
Newspapers published in Prague
Defunct newspapers published in Czechoslovakia
Publications established in 1828
Publications disestablished in 1938
Newspapers established in 2000